Ousmane N'Doye (born 21 March 1978) is a Senegalese former professional footballer who played as a defensive midfielder.

Club career
Born in Thiès, N'Doye played for nearly 20 clubs during his career, mainly in Portugal's Primeira Liga and the Romanian Liga I. In his country, he represented ASC Diaraf and ASC Jeanne d'Arc, moving abroad in 2002 and signing with French side Toulouse FC.

In the 2014–15 season, the 36-year-old N'Doye scored a career-best 12 goals in 23 matches for ASA Târgu Mureș, helping his team to the second position three points behind champions FC Steaua București. In September 2015, he renewed his contract for another year.

Early into 2016, N'Doye left the club without permission, but eventually returned to complete the campaign. On 12 August he signed with another team in the country, Liga III's CNS Cetate Deva.

In late September 2018, N'Doye came out retirement and joined amateurs CSM Târgu Mureș (Liga IV).

Personal life
N'Doye's younger brother, Dame, was also an international footballer.

Honours

Jeanne d'Arc
Senegal Premier League: 1999, 2001, 2002
Senegalese Super Cup: 2001

Toulouse
Ligue 2: 2002–03

Vaslui
Cupa Romaniei runner-up: 2008–09

Dinamo Bucuresti
Cupa Romaniei runner-up: 2010–11

Târgu Mureș
Supercupa României: 2015

References

External links

1978 births
Living people
Sportspeople from Thiès
Senegalese footballers
Association football midfielders
ASC Jaraaf players
ASC Jeanne d'Arc players
Ligue 1 players
Ligue 2 players
Toulouse FC players
FC Lorient players
Primeira Liga players
G.D. Estoril Praia players
F.C. Penafiel players
Associação Académica de Coimbra – O.A.F. players
Saudi Professional League players
Al-Shabab FC (Riyadh) players
Ettifaq FC players
Liga I players
Liga II players
FC Vaslui players
FC Dinamo București players
FC Astra Giurgiu players
AFC Săgeata Năvodari players
ASA 2013 Târgu Mureș players
CSM Deva players
Senegal international footballers
2004 African Cup of Nations players
2008 Africa Cup of Nations players
Senegalese expatriate footballers
Expatriate footballers in France
Expatriate footballers in Portugal
Expatriate footballers in Saudi Arabia
Expatriate footballers in Romania
Senegalese expatriate sportspeople in France
Senegalese expatriate sportspeople in Portugal
Senegalese expatriate sportspeople in Saudi Arabia
Senegalese expatriate sportspeople in Romania
Senegalese football managers
CSM Deva managers
Senegalese expatriate football managers
Expatriate football managers in Romania